Jesper Jensen may refer to:

 Jesper Jensen (boxer) (born 1967), Danish boxer
 Jesper Jensen (handballer) (born 1977), Danish handball player
 Jesper Jensen (ice hockey, born 1987), Danish ice hockey forward
 Jesper Jensen (ice hockey, born 1991), Danish ice hockey defenceman
 Jesper B. Monberg (born 1977 as Jesper Bruun Jensen), Danish speedway rider
 Jesper Jensen (footballer) (born 1988), Danish football midfielder